was a long running popular television detective series in Japan, which ran from 1977 to 1987. Aired on TV Asahi. It stars Hideaki Nitani.

Cast
 Hideaki Nitani as Kyōsuke Kamishiro (Boss of the Special Investigation Division)
 Hiroshi Fujioka as Tetsuo Sakurai
 Toshiyuki Nishida as Yōzō Takasugi
 Kojiro Hongo as Tsuyoshi Tachibana
 Hideji Ōtaki as Ippei Funamura
 Naoya Makoto as Ryuji Yoshino (1977–86)
 Atsushi Watanabe as Denkichi Tokida 
 Kenichi Sakurai as Jirō Taki
 Kiyotaka Mitsuki as Seishirō Inukai
 Shigeru Araki as Akira Tsugami
 Yusuke Natsu as Shunichi Kanō
 Yuji Abe as Toshio Sugi
 Masumi Sekiya as Mikiko Takasugi
 Katsuhiko Yokomitsu as Kanichi Kurebayashi

References

External links
 Tokusō Saizensen at Toei video

Japanese drama television series
Japanese crime television series
1970s Japanese television series
Japanese detective television drama series
Tokyo Metropolitan Police Department in fiction